Karikku is an Indian YouTube Channel in Malayalam, founded by Nikhil Prasad in 2018. The YouTube Channel gained popularity with their first Web series titled "Thera Para". Karikku has different business verticals including Fliq (multi genre web series space), Tuned (indie music label), Fuse (advertising and influencer marketing), Wybe (merchandising) and Zero (news aggregator).

The channel received the Golden Creator Award upon reaching one million subscribers on YouTube in 2019.

The Karikku YouTube Channel received the Mazhavil Entertainment award 2019 for the Best Original Content (Digital) presented by Mazhavil Manorama.

History 
The YouTube channel Karikku was launched on 16 August 2016 by Nikhil Prasad. Karikku uploaded its first video on April's Fools Day, 2018.

The channel's breakthrough came with the series Thera Para, which discusses the life of four young men in a very relatable manner, touching upon the day in the life of people around that age category. The video was later converted to a single watch of Season 1 with some minor edits and re-released in 2020. A movie with the same name is currently in the pre-production phase and was announced through their YouTube channel as a motion poster.

Its popularity grew rapidly throughout 2019, with the addition of new cast members and interesting plots. Film actors Tovino Thomas  (Gym Boys), Aju Varghese (Thera Para  Season 1 Finale), Rajisha vijayan(Valentine's Day Gift) and saniya iyyappan (Thera Para season 1 Finale) made cameo appearances.

They released a video in 2019 celebrating their new YouTube Silver Play Button, after crossing 100,000 subscribers (kittumo?), promoting more viewers to subscribe, as they aimed for the Golden Play Button.

In 2020, after a small break due to the COVID-19 crisis and the resulting lockdown, Karikku gradually started to upload videos, beginning with an episode based on a video call, creating a spin-off of the episode Bhaskaran Pillai technologies .

In collaboration with Netflix, mad tech released a video titled Ripper - the wanted Killer on 3 April 2021. The Sketch is a promotion for the Malayalam motion picture Irul and was released on the official Netflix India YouTube channel.

Mini YouTube-series and Videos

References 

Entertainment-related YouTube channels
Indian film websites
Indian YouTubers
Digital media organizations